West Hempstead is a hamlet and census-designated place (CDP) in the Town of Hempstead in Nassau County, on Long Island, in New York, United States. The population was 19,835 at the 2020 census. It is an unincorporated area in the Town of Hempstead and is represented by Councilman Edward Ambrosino.

The residents in the hamlet had once unsuccessfully proposed to change their hamlet's name to Mayfair Park.

History

West Hempstead first appeared on maps as the name of a Long Island Railroad station in 1893. There are three railroad stations within its borders: West Hempstead, Hempstead Gardens, and Lakeview. The line continues to Valley Stream where it joins the Babylon Branch. Halls Pond Park, the main park within West Hempstead, was dedicated by Nassau County in 1961. The smaller Echo Park contains a public indoor pool. Its name is derived from the community's first four little league teams: Eagles, Cardinal, Hawks, and Orioles. In 1956, the West Hempstead Public Library was founded and chartered by the State in 1967. Its present 28,000 square-foot facility was completed in 2007.

In 2001, residents of West Hempstead held a nonbinding referendum on renaming the community. The vote followed a two-year effort by the West Hempstead Civic Association and the West Hempstead Chamber of Commerce to give the community a unique name, distancing itself from the neighboring crime ridden Hempstead. By a 94-vote margin, West Hempstead retained its name over the proposed Mayfair Gardens.

West Hempstead is easily accessed from the Southern State Parkway at Exit 17N.

The West Hempstead Union Free School District currently operates 5 schools; 1 kindergarten, 2 elementary, 1 middle school and 1 high school.

West Hempstead's name reflects upon the fact that it is located immediately west of the Village of Hempstead.

Geography

West Hempstead lies on a gently sloping terrain between the Hempstead Plains and the Atlantic Ocean. Pine Stream runs through the center of West Hempstead, feeding into Halls Pond. The community is bordered on the east by Hempstead Lake State Park and on the south by the Southern State Parkway.

Demographics

2010 Census
As of the 2010 2010 Census, there were 4,867 families residing in the West Hempstead Census Designated Place (CDP) and the population density was 7,039.1 per square mile (2,716.2/km2). There were 6,110 housing units at an average density of 2,298.3/sq mi (886.9/km2).

There were 6,024 households, out of which 38.1% had children under the age of 18 living with them, 66.3% were married couples living together, 11.0% had a female householder with no husband present, and 19.2% were non-families. 15.9% of all households were made up of individuals, and 8.3% had someone living alone who was 65 years of age or older. The average household size was 3.09 and the average family size was 3.47.

The median income for a household in the CDP was $97,627 and the median income for a family was $102,481. Males had a median income of $52,391 versus $39,871 for females. The per capita income for the CDP was $32,732. About 2.4% of families and 3.7% of the population were below the poverty line, including 5.4% of those under age 18 and 3.4% of those age 65 or over.

2017 ACS
As of the American Community Survey of 2013–2017, there were 19,841 people in 6,148 households. The racial makeup of the CDP was 70.8% White, 12.8% African American, 0.5% Native American, 9.5% Asian, 0.0% Pacific Islander, 11.3% from other races, and 4.6% from two or more races. Hispanic or Latino of any race were 20.3% of the population.

In the 2017 ACS, the CDP population was spread out, with 23.4% under the age of 18 and 14.8% age 65 or older. The median age was 40.3 years.

The CDP is 5.1% people under age 5, 5.8% people age 5–9 years old, 7.9% people age 10–14 years old, 7.3% people age 15–19 years old, 7.0% people age 20–24 years old, 11.8% people age 25–34 years old, 11.1% people age 35–44 years old, 16.5% people age 45–54 years old, 7.2% people age 55–59 years old, 5.6% people age 60–64 years old, 8.1% people age 65–74 years old, 4.1% people age 75–84 years old, and 2.6% people age 85 or older.

In 2017, the West Hempstead CDP population had an approximately even number of males (9,922) and females (9,919). However, there is nuance to this data: for every 100 females age 18 and over, there were 97.2 males, and for every 100 females age 65 or over, there were only 65.7 males.

West Hempstead, along with adjoining Franklin Square has a sizable Orthodox Jewish population that counts seven synagogues and the Hebrew Academy of Nassau County elementary school among its local institutions.

Notable people
 Nathan Englander, American short story writer and novelist, was born and raised in West Hempstead.
 Kalomoira, popular Greek singer, was born in West Hempstead.
 Lucien Laurin, award-winning horse trainer and Belmont Stakes champion, lived in West Hempstead.
 Don McPherson, former NFL player
 Walt Whitman, American poet, essayist and journalist, was the headmaster of the West Hempstead-based District 17 Schoolhouse.
 Orville Wright, Inventor of powered flight, lived in West Hempstead in the early 1930s.
Joseph J. Sarcona, coached West Hempstead's Little League team to Long Island's first Little League World Series Championship, in 1962.

Local activities
 West Hempstead Chiefs Soccer Club
 The New York Equestrian Center, Horse Riding & Boarding
 Hempstead Lake State Park
 West Hempstead Community Support Association 
 West Hempstead Lions Club 
 West Hempstead Chamber of Commerce 
 West Hempstead Kiwanis Club 
 Boy Scout Troop 240
 Cub Scout Pack 240

References

External links 

 West Hempstead Chamber of Commerce official website

Census-designated places in New York (state)
Hempstead, New York
Census-designated places in Nassau County, New York